This is a list of United States Army Air Forces reconnaissance units, primarily operating during World War II.  The subsequent United States Air Force unit lineage is noted where applicable.

Aircraft operated

Groups

 1st Photographic Group
 May 1941-Oct 1944
 HQ USAAF; Second Air Force (ZI)
 Operated F-2 (C-45), F-3 (A-20), F-7 (B-24), F-9 (B-17), F-10 (B-25), A-29, and B-18
 Squadrons deployed Worldwide Photo-Mapping

 2d Reconnaissance Group
 Constituted as 2d Photographic Group
 May 1942-May 1944
 Second Air Force (ZI); Third Air Force (ZI)
 Operated F-3 (A-20), F-5 (P-38), F-7 (B-24), F-9 (B-17)
 Operational Training Unit

 3d Reconnaissance Group
 Constituted as 3d Photographic Group
 Jun 1942-Mar 1947
 Twelfth Air Force (MTO)
 Operated F-4/F-5 (P-38)
 Combat Photo-Reconnaissance

 4th Reconnaissance Group
 Constituted as 4th Photographic Group
 Jul 1942-Jan 1946
 Thirteenth Air Force (South, Southwest Pacific)
 Operated F-5 (P-38), F-10 (B-25)
 Combat Photo-Reconnaissance

 5th Reconnaissance Group
 Constituted as 5th Photographic Group
 Jul 1942-Oct 1945
 Twelfth Air Force; Fifteenth Air Force (MTO)
 Operated F-3 (A-20), F-4 (P-38), F-7 (B-24), F-9 (B-17), F-10 (B-25)
 Combat Photo-Reconnaissance

 6th Reconnaissance Group
 Constituted as 6th Photographic Group
 Feb 1943-Apr 1946
 Fifth Air Force (Southwest Pacific)
 Operated F-4/F-5 (P-38), F-7 (B-24), B-26
 Combat Photo-Reconnaissance

 7th Reconnaissance Group
 Constituted as 7th Photographic Group
 May 1943-Nov 1945
 Eighth Air Force (ETO)
 Operated Spitfire PR XI, P-51 (Escorts)
 Combat Photo-Reconnaissance

 8th Reconnaissance Group
 Sep 1943-Nov 1945
 Tenth Air Force (CBI)
 Operated F-5 (P-38), F-6 (P-51), F-7 (B-24), P-40 (Escorts)
 Combat Photo-Reconnaissance

 9th Reconnaissance Group
 Sep 1943-May 1944
 Third Air Force (ZI)
 Operated F-3 (A-20), F-4 (P-38), F-5 (P-38) F-7 (B-24), F-9 (B-17)
 Operational Training Unit

 10th Reconnaissance Group
 Constituted as 73d Observation Group
 Sep 1941-Jun 1948
 Ninth Air Force (ETO)
 Operated F-3 (A-20), F-5 (P-38), F-6 (P-51)
 Combat Photo-Reconnaissance
 Resesignated as USAF 10th Tactical Reconnaissance Group, Jun 1948

 11th Photographic Group
 Nov 1943-Oct 1944
 HQ USAAF (ZI)
 Squadrons deployed Worldwide
 Squadrons deployed Worldwide Photo-Mapping; Combat Photo-Reconnaissance in CBI
 Operated F-2 (C-45), F-3 (A-20), F-7 (B-24), F-9 (B-17), F-10 (B-25), F-13 (B-29)

 25th Bombardment Group (Reconnaissance)
 Jul 1944-Sep 1945
 Eighth Air Force (ETO)
 Operated Mosquito F-8-DH. Mosquito PR Mk XVI, F-5/P-38, F-7/B-24, F-9/B-17, F-10/B-25, B-26G Marauder (Night Reconnaissance)
 Combat Photo-Reconnaissance, Weather Reconnaissance, Electronic Counter-Measures
 Established as USAF 25th Tactical Reconnaissance Wing, July 1965

 26th Reconnaissance Group
 Aug 1941-Nov 1943; Dec 1946-Jun 1949
 First Air Force; Third Air Force (ZI); Air Force Reserve
 Operated F-3 (A-20), F-10 (B-25), P-39F-2
 Operational Training Unit
 Established as USAF 26th Strategic Reconnaissance Wing, May 1952

 59th Reconnaissance Group
 Constituted as 59th Observation Group
 1941-1942;1943-1944
 First Air Force; Third Air Force (ZI)
 Operated Light Observation Aircraft, P-39F-2
 Coastal patrols, Operational Training Unit

 65th Reconnaissance Group
 Constituted as 65th Observation Group
 Aug 1941-Oct 1942; Mar-Aug 1943;Dec 1946-Jun 1949
 Third Air Force (ZI); Air Force Reserve
 Operated Light Observation Aircraft, F-10 (B-25)
 Coastal patrols, Operational Training Unit

 66th Reconnaissance Group
 Constituted as 66th Observation Group
 Aug 1941-Apr 1944; Dec 1946-May 1951
 Third Air Force (ZI); Air Force Reserve
 Operated F-3 (A-20), F-10 (B-25), P-39F-2, P-40
 Operational Training Unit
 Reactivated as USAF 66th Tactical Reconnaissance Group, Jan 1953

 67th Reconnaissance Group
 Constituted as 67th Observation Group
 Sep 1941-Mar 1946
 Eighth Air Force; Ninth Air Force (ETO)
 Operated F-5 (P-38), F-6 (P-51), P-51 (Escorts)
 Combat Photo-Reconnaissance
 Reactivated as USAF 67th Tactical Reconnaissance Group, Jun 1948

 68th Reconnaissance Group
 Constituted as 68th Observation Group
 Aug 1941-Jun 1944; Mar 1947-Jun 1949
 Twelfth Air Force (MTO); Air Force Reserve
 Operated  Spitfire PR XI, F-3 (A-20), F-5 (P-38), F-6 (P-51), F-7 (B-24), F-9 (B-27), A-36, P-39F-2
 Combat Photo-Reconnaissance
 Reactivated as USAF 68th Tactical Reconnaissance Group, Oct 1951

 69th Reconnaissance Group
 Constituted as 69th Observation Group
 Aug 1941-Jul 1946
 Ninth Air Force (ETO)
 Operated Mosquito PR Mk XVI, F-3 (A-20), F-5 (P-38), F-6 (P-51), F-10 (B-25), P-39F-2, P-40
 Combat Photo-Reconnaissance

 70th Reconnaissance Group
 Constituted as 70th Observation Group
 Aug 1941-Nov 1943; Mar 1947-Jun 1949
 Second Air Force (ZI); Air Force Reserve
 Operated F-3 (A-20), F-10 (B-25), P-39F-2
 Operational Training Unit

 71st Reconnaissance Group
 Constituted as 71st Observation Group
 Aug 1941-Feb 1946; Feb 1947-Apr 1949
 Fifth Air Force (Southwest Pacific); Far East Air Forces (Occ Japan)
 Operated F-5 (P-38), F-10 (B-25)
 Combat Photo-Reconnaissance

 72d Reconnaissance Group
 Constituted as 72d Observation Group
 Aug 1941-Nov 1943; May 1947-Jun 1949
 Sixth Air Force (Caribbean); Air Force Reserve
 Operated B-18
 Antisubmarine Patrols, Photo-Mapping

 74th Reconnaissance Group
 Constituted as 74th Observation Group
 Feb 1942-Nov 1945; Dec 1946-Jun 1949
 Third Air Force (ZI); Air Force Reserve
 Operated F-3 (A-20), F-6 (P-51), F-10 (B-25), P-40
 Operational Training Unit

 75th Reconnaissance Group
 Constituted as 75th Observation Group
 Feb 1942-May 1944
 Third Air Force (ZI)
 Operated F-3 (A-20), F-10 (B-25), F-6 (P-51), P-39F-2, P-40
 Operational Training Unit
 Established as 75th Tactical Reconnaissance Wing in May 1966

 76th Reconnaissance Group
 Constituted as 76th Observation Group
 Feb 1942-Apr 1944
 Third Air Force (ZI)
 Operated F-3 (A-20), F-10 (B-25), P-39F-2, P-40
 Operational Training Unit

 77th Reconnaissance Group
 Constituted as 77th Observation Group
 Feb 1942-Nov 1943
 Third Air Force (ZI); Detachment in India, Feb-Jul 1943
 Operated F-3 (A-20), F-10 (B-25), P-39F-2, P-40
 Operational Training Unit: Combat Photo-Reconnaissance

 308th Reconnaissance Group (Weather)
 Oct 1946-Jan 1951
 Air Weather Service (MATS)
 Operated WB-29
 Weather Reconnaissance

 363d Reconnaissance Group
 Constituted as 363d Fighter Group
 Sep 1944-Dec 1945; Jul 1946-Jun 1948
 Ninth Air Force (ETO)
 Operated F-5 (F-5), F-6, (P-51)
 Combat Photo-Reconnaissance
 Redesignated as USAF 363d Tactical Reconnaissance Group, Jun 1951

 376th Reconnaissance Group
 May 1947-Sep 1948
 Strategic Air Command
 Operated WB-29
 Weather Reconnaissance

 423d Reconnaissance Group
 Constituted as 423d Observation Group
 Mar-Apr 1943
 Third Air Force (ZI)
 Operated F-5 (F-38), F-6, (P-51)
 Operational Training Unit

 424th Reconnaissance Group
 Constituted as 424th Observation Group
 Mar-Apr 1943
 Third Air Force (ZI)
 Not fully organized, disbanded

 426th Reconnaissance Group
 Jul-Aug 1943
 Third Air Force (ZI)
 Not fully organized, disbanded

 432d Reconnaissance Group
 Constituted as 432d Observation Group
 Feb-Nov 1943
 Army Air Forces School of Applied Tactics (ZI)
 Operated F-5 (F-5), F-6, (P-51), P-39F-2
 Operational Training Unit
 Reactivated as USAF 432d Tactical Reconnaissance Group, Jan 1954

Wings

 90th Reconnaissance Wing
 Oct 1943-Oct 1945
 Twelfth Air Force (MTO); Fifteenth Air Force (MTO)
 Reactivated as USAF 90th Air Division (Reconnaissance), Apr 1948-Jun 1949

 91st Reconnaissance Wing
 Oct 1943-Jan 1946
 Fifth Air Force (Southwest Pacific)
 Reactivated as USAF 91st Air Division (Reconnaissance), Apr 1948-Jun 1949

 311th Reconnaissance Wing
 Jan 1944-Apr 1948
 HQ USAAF
 Units deployed Worldwide
 Redesignated as USAF 311th Air Division (Reconnaissance), Apr 1948-Nov 1949

 325th Reconnaissance Wing
 Aug 1944-Oct 1945
 Eighth Air Force (ETO)
 Redesignated as USAF 325th Air Division (Reconnaissance), Apr 1948-Jun 1949

References

 Maurer, Maurer (1983). Air Force Combat Units Of World War II. Maxwell AFB, AL: Office of Air Force History. .
 

Reconaissance
United States Army Air Forces reconnaissance
 
United States Army Air Forces lists
Reconnaissance units